The Port of Maputo, also called the Maputo-Matola port complex, is a Mozambican port located in the cities of Maputo and Matola. They are installed in Maputo Bay, on the north bank of the Espírito Santo estuary, which is separated from the Mozambique Channel by the islands of Inhaca and Portugueses and by the Machangulo peninsula.

The port belongs to the Mozambican government, which is responsible for its administration through the public-private joint venture "Maputo Port Development Company" (MPDC). It is a partnership among the Mozambique Ports and Railways (CFM), Dubai-based DP World, and Grindrod Ltd, a South African holding company. The company was hired in 2003 by the government of Mozambique and functions as port operator and port authority, directing shipping, port maintenance, security, cargo terminal management, and future development planning. Major port operator Dubai Ports World has invested in the company and its 15‑year government concession.

The port is the terminal for three railway lines — Goba, Limpopo and Ressano Garcia — transporting products from South Africa, Eswatini and Zimbabwe. Another important flow link is via the N1 highway. It is a fundamental part of the logistics complexes of the "Maputo Corridor", the "Limpopo Corridor" and the "Libombo Corridor".

The foundation of the port, in 1544, was a fundamental element for the establishment of the city of Maputo. It received berth and quay structures only in 1850, when it became known as Port of Lourenço Marques and Port of Delagoa Bay.

History
The Port of Maputo had been a busy hub much before the establishment of the Maputo Port Development Company (MPDC); in 1972, it was handling close to 17 million tons annually. The Mozambican Civil War, which began in 1977, disrupted this streak of prosperity; by 1988, the Port of Maputo barely handled a million tons per year. The war ended in 1992, but it was not until 2003, when the MPDC was formed as a public-private partnership, that the Port of Maputo began to see an increase in business. The port went from handling 4.5 million tons per year in 2003 to handling 14 million tons—the expected throughput of 2012.

Port
The deepwater port of Maputo consists of two principal areas of usage:
 Maputo Cargo Terminals
 Matola Bulk Terminals

LNG Development 
In November 2019, international oil major Total S.A. and a gas developer, Gigajoule, signed a joint development agreement for the importation of Liquefied natural gas at the Matola harbour, Maputo. The project is expected to commence from 2022 and will see a floating storage and regasification unit moored at the harbour.

See also 
Government of Mozambique
Maputo River
Transport in Mozambique
Liquefied natural gas
List of ports in Mozambique

References

External links
 Port Maputo official site
 Engineering News, Global port operator invests in port of Maputo, 25 April 2008

Government of Mozambique
Transport in Mozambique
Port authorities
Port operating companies
Maputo
Mozambique Channel
Maputo